Falkovitshella is a genus of moths in the family Scythrididae.

Species
There are 10 species described.
 Falkovitshella ammobia (Falkovitsh, 1972)
 Falkovitshella asema (Falkovitsh, 1972)
 Falkovitshella asthena (Falkovitsh, 1972)
 Falkovitshella deserticola (Nupponen, 2010) Passerin d'Entrèves & Roggero, 2013
 Falkovitshella hindukushi Passerin d'Entrèves & Roggero, 2013
 Falkovitshella hypolepta (Falkovitsh, 1972)
 Falkovitshella karvoneni (Nupponen, 2010) Passerin d'Entrèves & Roggero, 2013
 Falkovitshella mongholica (Passerin d'Entrèves & Roggero, 2006)
 Falkovitshella pediculella (Bengtsson, 1997)
 Falkovitshella physalis (Falkovitsh, 1972)

References

External links
 iNaturalist

Scythrididae
Moth genera